Robert Half, formally referred to as Robert Half International Inc., is a global human resource consulting firm based in Menlo Park and San Ramon, California, founded in 1948.  It is a member of the S&P 500, and is credited as being the world's first and largest accounting and finance staffing firm, with over 345 locations worldwide.

Robert Half has a variety of divisions. The company operates through three segments: temporary and consultant staffing, permanent placement staffing, and risk consulting and internal audit services. Through its Accountemps, Robert Half Finance & Accounting, Robert Half Management Resources divisions, it provides temporary, full-time and project professionals in the fields of accounting and finance. Other divisions include Robert Half Technology, providing software, application, IT infrastructure and operations professionals, Office Team, which specializes in administrative and customer service staffing, The Creative Group, that focuses on design, artistic, and creative talent, and Robert Half Legal that offer flexible and direct-hire staffing for legal professionals. In 2002, Protiviti Inc. was founded as a subsidiary of Robert Half, which provides internal audit, financial, operations, technology, governance, and risk consulting services.

Robert Half is listed by Fortune magazine as among the "World's Most Admired Companies" in the temporary-help industry for 25 years consecutively (as of 2022) since it first made the list in 1998.

History

The company's founding was in 1948, in New York City, with its original name being variously reported as being Robert Half Inc., Robert Half Finance & Accounting, and Robert Half Personnel Agency. The founding, in any case, is reported to have been of two separate business entities, the Robert Half (RH) portion as "an employment agency for accountants," and the Accountemps portion "to supply accountants and other financial professionals… on a temporary basis." Founder Robert Half had previously managed the hiring of accounting staff for a sizeable textile manufacturing concern, and saw an opportunity as no placement agency had been focusing on this sector of the market.

In the mid- to late-1980s, Robert Half (RH) altered its prior focus—which had been like that of the field in general—from relatively undifferentiated temporary clerical and light industry staffing, to providing temporary workers at higher skill levels via new "professional staffing divisions". Having grown to over 150 locations in the United States and launched an aggressive campaign to re-purchase many of the separate franchises, the firm went public in 1987, then expanded its operations into Europe in 1993. In addition to their Accountemps brand, the firm expanded to include specialty groups focusing on technology, legal and creative services personnel. Inroads into the legal sector began with the company's 1991 acquisition of "The Affiliates, a firm in Southern California that placed temporary and permanent paralegal, legal administrative, and other legal support personnel," with it being renamed as Robert Half Legal.

Robert Half went on to establish itself as a key information provider for government agencies and others seeking statistics and trends regarding employment, with its market-specific salary guides being used as a resource by the U.S Department of Labor in the preparation of their own forecasts.

In addition to their main staffing line of business, RH also provides independent risk consulting, internal audit and information technology consulting services via its Protiviti subsidiary, which was founded in 2002 with the acquisition of former employees of Arthur Andersen. Since then, the group has grown from 700 to over 2,900 staff, and continues to be led by Andersen alumni.   
 
In 2003, the company was finally able to buy back the last of the few remaining independent franchise operations.

In 2006, RH (through subsidiary Protiviti Inc.) acquired the assets of PG Lewis & Associates, a leading national provider of Data Forensics and Cyber Security services founded in 2003 by serial technology entrepreneur, Paul G. Lewis.  Financial terms were not disclosed.

In April 2022, Robert Half moved its legal consulting service line to Protiviti, which allows Protiviti to expand its legal consulting practice. The service line supports clients with a broader range of legal, compliance, governance, technology, investigation and transaction-related business needs.

Published works
Founder Robert Half's tradition of authoring books on the industry—such as Making It Big in Data Processing and How to Get a Better Job in This Crazy World—was continued by the CEO of this date, Harold M. "Max" Messmer, in the form of works like Job Hunting for Dummies.

See also

 Protiviti
 Human resource consulting
 Arthur Andersen

References

Further reading

Verified sources
 AT Staff, "Staffing Firm Founder Robert Half Dead at 82," Accounting Today, September 24, 2001, p. 56.
 Brandstrader, J.R., "It's an Ill Wind," Barron's, March 25, 1996, p. 18.
 Byrnes, Nanette, et al., "The Good CEO," Businessweek, September 23, 2002.
 Caldwell, Douglas E., "The New Economy's Gold Digger," Silicon Valley/San Jose Business Journal, March 16, 2001, p. 38.
 Desloge, Rick, "Robert Half, Kelly Services Share in Temp Firm Growth," St. Louis Business Journal, December 1, 1997, p. 24.
 Fleming, Eric C., "Job-Recruiter Blues: Will Paltry Demand Drain Robert Half Shares?," Barron's, November 11, 2002, p. T8.
 Jordon, Steve, "New Risk-Consulting Firm Lures Ex-Andersen Employees," Omaha World Herald, June 6, 2002.
 Lenz, Edward. "Flexible Employment: Positive Work Strategies for the 21st Century," Journal of Labor Research, 1996.
 Marsh, Ann, "We're Your Talent Agent," Forbes, August 10, 1998, p. 104.
 Morningstar Staff, "Morningstar Names Max Messmer of Robert Half International as 2003 CEO of the Year," Morningstar, January 6, 2004.
 Murphy, Victoria, "Robert Half International: Everyone Need Apply," Forbes, January 8, 2001, p. 106.
 NATSS Staff, "Temporary Help Services Continue Growth; Several Factors Cited," Alexandria, Va.: National Association of Temporary Staffing Services, June 17, 1996.
 Robson, Douglas, "Half's Measures: Robert Half Harnesses Outsourcing Trend to Prove that Even Big Businesses Can Grow Quickly," San Francisco Business Times, April 18, 1997, p. 5A.
 Siwolop, Sana, "Renting the Workers, But Buying the Stock," The New York Times, December 15, 1996.
 Svaldi, Aldo, "California-Based Staffing-Services Firm Hires 760 Andersen Accountants," Denver Post, June 6, 2002.

Other sources
  Note, this source contains no content other than an advertising blurb and a 2009 contact phone number for job seekers. Specifically, it contains no reliable information on this company's sector, or its being a member of the S&P 500, or its size and rank among accounting and finance staffing firms.

External links

European Locations

 Robert Half United Kingdom 
 Robert Half Germany 
 Robert Half France 
 Robert Half Belgium 
 Robert Half Netherlands 
 Robert Half Luxembourg 
 Robert Half Austria 
 Robert Half Switzerland

Middle Eastern Locations
 Robert Half United Arab Emirates

APAC Locations

 Robert Half Australia 
 Robert Half New Zealand 
 Robert Half Japan 
 Robert Half Hong Kong 
 Robert Half Singapore 
 Robert Half China

South America Locations

 Robert Half Brazil 
 Robert Half Chile

North America Locations

 Robert Half US 
 Robert Half Canada

  (1981–1993) 
 
 Robert Half International and Robert Half Legal at LC Authorities
 RH International and RH Legal at WorldCat

Human resource management consulting firms
Companies listed on the New York Stock Exchange
Companies based in Menlo Park, California
Employment agencies of the United States
American companies established in 1948
Financial services companies established in 1948
Consulting firms established in 1948
1948 establishments in New York City